The Eurovision Young Musicians 2008 was the fourteenth edition of the Eurovision Young Musicians, held at the Rathausplatz in Vienna, Austria on 9 May 2008. Organised by the European Broadcasting Union (EBU) and host broadcaster Österreichischer Rundfunk (ORF), musicians from seven countries participated in the televised final. This was the second time that the competition was held on an open-air stage and was the beginning of the annual Vienna Festival.

A total of sixteen countries took part in the competition therefore a semi-final was held at the Theater an der Wien on 4 and 5 May 2008. All participants performed a classical piece of their choice accompanied by the Vienna Symphony Orchestra, conducted by Aleksandar Markovic. (as an independent nation) and  made their début while  returned.

Dionysios Grammenos of Greece won the contest, with Finland and Norway placing second and third respectively. Grammenos is the first woodwind player to win the competition (previous winners have played piano, violin or cello). A new feature in 2008 was the audience prize, voted for by television viewers in the host country via SMS. The third prize winning Norwegian violinist Eldbjørg Hemsing was the winner of this public vote.

Location

Rathausplatz, a square outside the Wiener Rathaus city hall of Vienna, was the host location for the 2008 edition of the Eurovision Young Musicians final. The Theater an der Wien, a theatre in Vienna, Austria, hosted the semi-final round.

Format
Lidia Baich and Christoph Wagner-Trenkwitz were the hosts of the 2008 contest. The interval act was Angelika Kirchschlager performing "One Life to Live" alone and "We Dream Together" with the Vienna Boys' Choir.

Results

Semi-final
A total of sixteen countries took part in the semi-final round of the 2008 contest, of which seven qualified to the televised grand final.

Part 1 (4 May)

Part 2 (5 May)

Final 

Awards were given to the top three countries. The table below highlights these using gold, silver, and bronze. The placing results of the remaining participants is unknown and never made public by the European Broadcasting Union.

Jury members 
The jury members consisted of the following:

Semi-final 

 – Jeanette de Boer
 – Günter Voglmayr
 – Franz Bartolomey
 – Ranko Marković
 – Kaja Danczowska
 – Jerzy Maksymiuk

Final

 – Sir Roger Norrington (head)
 – Ranko Markovic
/ – Jeanette de Boer
 – Lars Anders Tomter
 – Günter Voglmayr
 – Alison Balsom

Broadcasting
The competition was transmitted live over the Eurovision Network by 18 broadcasters. Iceland and Lithuania broadcast the contest in addition to the competing countries.

See also
 Eurovision Song Contest 2008
 Eurovision Dance Contest 2008
 Junior Eurovision Song Contest 2008

References

External links 

 
 Pictures from the Eurovision Young Musicians 2008 Finale in Vienna

Eurovision Young Musicians by year
2008 in music
2008 in Austria
Music festivals in Austria
Events in Vienna
May 2008 events in Europe